Hesamabad (also Romanized as Ḩesāmābād; also known as Hisamabād) is a village in Mofatteh Rural District, in the Central District of Famenin County, Hamadan Province, Iran. At the 2006 census, its population was 156, in 33 families.

References 

Populated places in Famenin County